Kalateh-ye Akhvand or Kalateh-ye Akhund may refer to:
 Kalateh-ye Akhund, Razavi Khorasan